Trelawny or Trelawney may refer to:

Places
 Trelawny (electoral division), an electoral division of Cornwall
 Trelawny, Black Hill, Ballarat, a heritage house in Ballarat, Victoria, Australia
 Trelawny, Jamaica, a parish of Cornwall County, Jamaica
 Trelawny, Pelynt (alias Trelawne), an historic manor and the historic seat of the Trelawny baronets in Cornwall
 Trelawney, Zimbabwe, a village in the province of Mashonaland West

Other uses
 Trelawny (surname)
 Trelawny baronets
 Trelawny Island, an islet near Looe Island, off Cornwall
 Trelawny League, a football league based in Cornwall
 Trelawny Tigers, a motorcycle speedway team
 "The Song of the Western Men", also known as "Trelawny", a Cornish anthem about Sir Jonathan Trelawny
 Trelawny of the 'Wells', an 1898 play by Arthur Wing Pinero
 Trelawny, a 1972 Julian Slade musical based on the Pinero play
  – any one of several vessels of that name
 Squire Trelawney, a supporting character from Treasure Island

See also